The 1876 College of the City of New York football team represented the City College of New York during the 1876 college football season. The team played in at least one game, losing 0–6 against Columbia. Another game, a win against NYU, has been listed in some sources, but not in others.

Schedule

Notes

References

CCNY
CCNY Beavers football seasons
CCNY Lavender football